Gérard Lauzier (30 November 1932 – 6 December 2008) was a French comics author and movie director, best known as one of the leading authors in the more adult-oriented French comics scene of the 1970s and 1980s.

Biography
Gérard Lauzier was born in Marseille on 30 November 1932. He studied philosophy and afterwards architecture at the École des Beaux-Arts in Paris. He worked in a press agency before travelling to Brazil, where he collaborated on the new capital Brasilia. In 1959, he got conscription for the Algerian War.

In Brazil, he contributed editorial cartoons to Jornal do Bahia until he left the country in the wake of the 1964 military coup. Back in France, he worked for a number of magazines, most notably the soft erotic Lui where he made the series Les sextraordinaires aventures de Zizi et Peter Panpan. His major comics work appeared in the Franco-Belgian comics magazine, Pilote, where he worked between 1974 and 1985 (by this time, Pilote magazine had moved in a more adult direction). His main series of this period are Lili Fatale and Tranches de vie. His most iconic character is Michel Choupon, an oversexed and philosophical 18-year-old, who starred in the comic Souvenirs d'un Jeune Homme and in the movie P'tit Con.

In later years, he became a film director, sometimes with movies based on his comics or on new stories. His most famous film is the 1991 Mon père ce héros with Gérard Depardieu, remade in English as My Father the Hero. In 1996 he directed The Best Job in the World which was entered into the 20th Moscow International Film Festival. He also contributed dialogues to other movies, including the 1999 Asterix and Obelix vs Caesar.

He died on 6 December 2008 in Paris, aged 76.

Works
 1973 : Un certain malaise, Dargaud
 1974 : Lili Fatale, Dargaud
 1975 : Tranches de vie, 5 tomes publiés en 1975, 76, 77, 78 et 86, Dargaud
 1977 : Les aventures d'Al Crane (dessiné par Alexis), Dargaud
 1977 : Chroniques de l'île grande, Dargaud
 1978 : Le retour d'Al Crane (dessiné par Alexis), Dargaud
 1978 : La course du rat, Dargaud
 1979 : Les Sextraordinaires Aventures de Zizi et Peter Panpan, Glénat
 1980 : La tête dans le sac, Dargaud
 1980 : Les sexties, Glénat
 1981 : Les Cadres, Dargaud
 1983 : Souvenirs d'un jeune homme, Dargaud
 1992 : Portrait de l'artiste, Dargaud
 1999 : Le fils du Français

In 1981, publisher Dargaud released a two volume collection Lauzier (Intégrale), containing Tranches de vie I, II, III, IV in the first volume, and La course du rat - La tête dans les sac - Lili fatale - L'île grande in the second one.

Awards
1967: Prix Jean Bellus
1978: Angoulême International Comics Festival Award for Best French Author
1981: Adamson Award
1993: Grand Prix de la ville d'Angoulême

Notes

Further reading
 Javier Alcázar (2008) LAUZIER (GÉRARD LAUZIER)

External links

Biography at Lambiek Comiclopedia

1932 births
2008 deaths
French comics artists
French comics writers
French film directors
Grand Prix de la ville d'Angoulême winners
French male dramatists and playwrights
French male writers
20th-century French male writers